Bernt Wilhelm Westermann (1781 in Copenhagen – 1868) was a wealthy Danish businessman who collected insects.

An amateur insect collector Westermann travelled to Calcutta (India) and later to Jakarta (Indonesia) as an employee of an English business firm.

At the Cape of Good Hope, in Bengal and Java he collected insects for English and Dutch friends, amongst others for Thomas Horsfield. In 1817 he returned to Copenhagen becoming a shipowner and owner of a sugar-refinery at Slotholmsgade in Copenhagen.

Insects from all orders acquired and collected during the rest of his life added to his Cape, Java and Bengal insects to form a notable collection. In all there were 45,000 species in  beautiful condition. The collection can be admired today in the Royal Museum Collection in the University of Copenhagen.

Sources
 Entom. Meddel. 15, 1936, p. 161-164, fig. 39-40 portr., p. 197-198.
 Flora Malesiana ser. 1, 5: Cyclopaedia of collectors, Supplement I
 Pont, A. C., 1995 Steenstrupia Copenhagen 21(2): 125 - 154 (Sammlungsverbleib) [11808].

External links
 Article about Westerman, from Dansk biografisk Lexikon (Danish)

1781 births
1868 deaths
19th-century Danish businesspeople
Businesspeople from Copenhagen
Danish lepidopterists
Danish businesspeople in shipping